Tibor Gallai (born Tibor Grünwald, 15 July 1912 – 2 January 1992) was a Hungarian mathematician. He was a student of Dénes Kőnig and an advisor of László Lovász. He was a corresponding member of the Hungarian Academy of Sciences (1991).

His main results 
The Edmonds–Gallai decomposition theorem, which was proved independently by Gallai and Jack Edmonds, describes finite graphs from the point of view of matchings. Gallai also proved, with Milgram, Dilworth's theorem in 1947, but as they hesitated to publish the result, Dilworth independently discovered and published it.

Gallai was the first to prove the higher-dimensional version of van der Waerden's theorem.

With Paul Erdős he gave a necessary and sufficient condition for a sequence to be the degree sequence of a graph, known as the Erdős–Gallai theorem.

See also 
 Gallai–Hasse–Roy–Vitaver theorem
 Sylvester–Gallai theorem
 Gallais-Edmonds decomposition

References

External links

1912 births
1992 deaths
20th-century Hungarian mathematicians
Members of the Hungarian Academy of Sciences
Graph theorists
Austro-Hungarian mathematicians